The Carlton House is a historic house located at 434 South Lakeshore Drive in Lake Village, Arkansas.

Description and history 
The two-story, Colonial Revival style house was designed by local architect Albert G. Simms and constructed in 1906. The central facade has a large central projection with a gabled roof. This section is fronted by a porch with a low pitch hip roof, which continues around the sides of the projection, and is supported by simple Colonial Revival columns. The projecting section's gable end hangs over a recessed second floor porch area that has a low railing, that also has a flush polygonal bay section that is continued on the first floor, where the main entrance is located. The house is one of a small number of surviving Colonial Revival houses from an era when Lake Village was developed as a resort area.

The house was listed on the National Register of Historic Places on June 5, 1991.

See also
National Register of Historic Places listings in Chicot County, Arkansas

References

Houses on the National Register of Historic Places in Arkansas
Colonial Revival architecture in Arkansas
Houses in Chicot County, Arkansas
Houses completed in 1906
National Register of Historic Places in Chicot County, Arkansas
Lake Village, Arkansas
1906 establishments in Arkansas